The Giant Dipper, also known as the Mission Beach Roller Coaster and historically by other names, is a historical wooden roller coaster located in Belmont Park, a small amusement park in the Mission Beach area of San Diego, California.  Built in 1925, it and its namesake at the Santa Cruz Beach Boardwalk are the only remaining wooden roller coasters on the West Coast designed by noted roller coaster designers Frank Prior and Frederick Church, and the only one whose construction they supervised.  It was added to the National Register of Historic Places in 1978 and designated a National Historic Landmark in 1987.

Description
The Giant Dipper is located at the northeast corner of Belmont Park, a waterfront amusement park at the junction of Mission Boulevard and West Mission Bay Drive. A sign with the name "Belmont" is affixed to the wooden trestle structure at its northeast edge.

History
The coaster was built in 1925 as part of a major real estate development led by John D. and Adolph Spreckels to attract visitors and residents to the Mission Beach area.  The Mission Beach Amusement Center was built at a cost of $2.5 million and opened in 1925, with this roller coaster as one of its main attractions.  It was designed by Church and Prior, coaster designers based in Venice, California, who also oversaw its construction.  The Spreckelses bequeathed the attraction to the city, which in 1954 was leased to Jack Ray.  He renamed the park Belmont Park, after another park in Montreal.  The roller coaster was severely damaged by fire in 1955, and Ray subsequently declared bankruptcy.

Threatened with demolition by the city in 1978, local citizens banded together to rescue it and a few surviving attractions of the defunct park.  It underwent a full restoration in 1989–90.

Events
In 1997, the Giant Dipper held a coaster–riding marathon sponsored by a local radio station, Star 100.7.  The marathon consisted of eleven consecutive days riding the coaster for more than 12 hours per day. The radio station arranged a second marathon in 1998, which was eventually won by contestants who split a check for $50,000 in cash prize after riding the coaster for 70 days.

Popular culture
The Giant Dipper and Belmont Park amusement center are included in author Stephen M. Silverman's 2019 book The Amusement Park: 900 Years of Thrills and Spills, and the Dreamers and Schemers Who Built Them.

References

External links

National Register of Historic Places in San Diego
Tourist attractions in San Diego
National Historic Landmarks in California
Buildings and structures in San Diego
Roller coasters introduced in 1925
Wooden roller coasters